is the sixth studio album by Japanese band Wagakki Band. It was released on August 17, 2022 through Universal Sigma in five editions: a two-CD release with an instrumental disc, streaming, the First-Press Limited ∞ Edition with the 8th Anniversary Japan Tour ∞ -Infinity- Blu-ray, the First-Press Limited Vocalo Edition with a bonus track and a documentary DVD, and the Shin Yaeryu (FC Limited) Edition box set, which combines all physical media editions with nine extra DVDs. Like the band's 2014 debut album, Vocalo Zanmai consists of Vocaloid (and two CeVIO) songs covered in the band's style of mixing traditional Japanese musical instruments (wagakki) with heavy metal.

The album peaked at No. 4 on Oricon's albums chart.

Track listing
All tracks are arranged by Wagakki Band.

Personnel 
 Yuko Suzuhana – vocals
 Machiya – guitar
 Beni Ninagawa – tsugaru shamisen
 Kiyoshi Ibukuro – koto
 Asa – bass
 Daisuke Kaminaga – shakuhachi
 Wasabi – drums
 Kurona – wadaiko

Charts

References

External links 
  (Wagakki Band)
  (Universal Music Japan)
 

Wagakki Band albums
2022 albums
Japanese-language albums
Universal Sigma albums